Isiolo County is a county in the former Eastern Province of Kenya. Its population is 268,002 (2019 census) and its capital and largest city is Isiolo. Isiolo County is to be the first county to be developed as part of the Kenya Vision 2030 program. Other upcoming urban centres are: Garbatulla, Modogashe, Kinna, Merti and Oldonyiro.

The local topography is arid or semi-arid low plains. Ewaso Nyiro River flows through the county and partly bounds it. It borders Marsabit County to the north, Wajir County to the east, Garissa and Tana River counties to the south east, Meru County to the south, Laikipia County to the south west and Samburu County to the west.

Three different National Game Reserves are located in Isiolo County: Bisanadi National Reserve, Buffalo Springs National Reserve and Shaba National Reserve.

Demographics
Isiolo county has a total population of 268,002 persons as 2019 census and of this 139,510 are males; 128,483 are females; 9 intersex persons.
There is an average size of 4.6 persons per household and a population density of 11 persons per square Km.

Source

Infrastructure and transport

Isiolo covered by 1,185.49 km of earth, 263.7 km of murram and 35 km of bitumen as at 2014. There are 1,149 installed letter boxes, 851 rented letter boxes and vacant letter boxes.

Isiolo airport is one of the key airport in the county.

Administrative and political units
As of 2018, the county has two constituencies (Isiolo North Constituency and Isiolo South Constituency), three sub-counties and ten wards.

There are a total of 10 county assembly wards, 71 locations and 144 sub-locations

Political leadership 
Mohamed Kuti is the second governor for Isiolo and took office in 2017 and he deputised by Ibrahim Abdi Issa. Adan Dullo Fatuma is the senator and also the first woman to be elected as a senator in Kenya.  Rehema Dida Jaldesa is the sitting women representative for isiolo and second to hold the office.

Education 
There are 213 ECD centres with enrolment of 5148 pupils, 124 primary schools of which 107 are public and 17 are private schools. 23 secondary schools are spread across the county of which 16 are public and 7 are private schools.

Furthermore, there are two youth polytechnics, three tertiary institutions and two vocational training centres in the county.

Health 
There are three hospitals in Isiolo County, two of which are government owned. One hospital is a faith based organisation. There are also five health centres, thirty three dispensaries, and three clinics.

Isiolo county has a total of 214 medical personnel of different cadre ranging from doctors to biochemists.

Economy 
The four main crops planted in Isiolo are maize, beans, sorghum and green grams. Livestock is also sold and the four animals kept are cattle (indigenous), cattle (dairy), camels, sheep, and goats.

A total of 178 ponds were in various places in the county in 2014.

Urbanisation
 Source: USAid Kenya

Notable people

 Hon. Godana Doyo, First governor, Isiolo County
 Mr. Barnabas Esunyen, First County Chief officer of ICT of Isiolo County government 2013-2017
 Hon. Rehema Jaldesa, women representative of Isiolo County
 Hon. Mohammed Kuti, governor, Isiolo County & a 2 term MP, Isiolo North

See also
Garissa County
Isiolo massacre
Laikipia County
Maisha Bora
Marsabit County
Meru County
Samburu County
Tana River County
Wajir County

References

External links
 http://www.iwmi.cgiar.org/Publications/Working_Papers/working/WOR106.pdf
 http://www.aridland.go.ke/bulletins/July%202006-Isiolo.pdf

 
Counties of Kenya